Gabrielle Marie Vincent (born December 7, 1997) is an American soccer player who currently plays as a defender for Washington Spirit in the National Women's Soccer League (NWSL).

She played college soccer at the University of Louisville.

Early life 
Vincent grew up in Columbia, Maryland and is the daughter of Mark and Jennifer Vincent. She attended Oakland Mills High School for her freshman and sophomore years and transferred to McDonogh School for her junior and senior years. She also played for Maryland United FC under coach Shannon Higgins-Cirovski.

Louisville Cardinals, 2015–2018 
Vincent attended the University of Louisville where she played for the Cardinals women's soccer team from 2015 to 2018. She started in all 54 appearances and scored 6 goals and 3 assists. While in college, Vincent majored in mechanical engineering.

Club career

Utah Royals FC, 2019–2020
After Vincent wasn't selected in the 2019 NWSL College Draft, she was invited to open try-outs by several teams, including the Utah Royals. Following try-outs with the Royals, Vincent was invited by coach Laura Harvey to remain with the team during preseason.  In April 2019, Vincent was signed by the Utah Royals to their supplemental roster. She made her debut in a 1–1 draw against the North Carolina Courage on May 19, 2019. Vincent started seven games for the Royals while their internationals were away for the World Cup. On July 26, 2019, Vincent was signed to a full contract by Utah.

References

External links 
 Instagram
 Twitter
 Real Salt Lake player profile
 Louisville Cardinals player profile

1997 births
Living people
American women's soccer players
People from Columbia, Maryland
Soccer players from Maryland
Utah Royals FC players
Women's association football defenders
Louisville Cardinals women's soccer players
National Women's Soccer League players
Kansas City Current players
African-American women's soccer players
21st-century African-American sportspeople
21st-century African-American women
Washington Spirit players